The Rhode Island Department of Health is a state government agency located in Providence, Rhode Island. The interim Director of the Department of Health is James McDonald, who succeeded Nicole Alexander-Scott in January 2022.

Mission 
The Department's mission is "to prevent disease and protect and promote the health and safety of the people of Rhode Island."

Divisions and Centers 

The Rhode Island Department of Health coordinates statewide public health activities across the state. All programs and services are coordinated by Divisions and Centers.
 Central Management is divided into three programs: Executive Functions, Management Services, and Emergency Preparedness and Response. Executive Functions is headed by the Director of Health and oversees all Department-sponsored activities. Management Services oversees the Department budget and provides support to manage programs. Emergency Preparedness and Response plans, assesses, educates, and supports the community during disasters or emergencies.
 The Office of State Medical Examiners investigates causes of death that may endanger the community and uses this information to keep the public aware and safe.
 Environmental and Health Services Regulation licenses and regulates health professionals and monitors beach and drinking water quality.
 The State Laboratories support scientific research to detect diseases, protect the public from terrorism threats health and use health evidence in crime investigations.
 Public Health Information provides information for the public to understand health risks and make healthy and safe choices.
 Community and Family Health and Equity develops programs to eliminate health disparities by ensuring equal access, creating partnerships with the community and healthcare facilities, promoting healthy lifestyles, and educating citizens on public health issues.
 Infectious Disease and Epidemiology conducts disease surveillance, responds to outbreaks, and provides health education.

References

External links
Guide to the Department of Health Library records from the Rhode Island State Archives
1986-1987 Department of Health Division of Drug Control annual report from the Rhode Island State Archives

State agencies of Rhode Island
State departments of health of the United States
Medical and health organizations based in Rhode Island